Ambassador Apartments is a historic apartment building located at Springfield, Greene County, Missouri. It was built in 1928, and is a four-story Commercial Block apartment building with a flat roof, red brick walls and simple Tudor style stone accents. The building houses 33 studio and one bedroom apartments. Also on the property is a contributing small ceramic block garage built about 1933.

It was listed on the National Register of Historic Places in 2008.

References

Residential buildings on the National Register of Historic Places in Missouri
Residential buildings completed in 1928
Buildings and structures in Springfield, Missouri
National Register of Historic Places in Greene County, Missouri